This is a list of rural localities in Murmansk Oblast, organized by the district or municipality they are within or subordinated to, respectively. Murmansk Oblast is a federal subject (an oblast) of Russia, located in the northwestern part of the country. Its administrative center is the city of Murmansk. As of the 2010 Census, its population was 795,409.

Alexandrovsk 
Rural localities in Alexandrovsk:

 Belokamenka
 Kuvshinskaya Salma
 Olenya Guba
 Retinskoye
 Sayda-Guba

Apatity 
Rural localities in Apatity:

 Khibiny
 Tik-Guba

Kandalakshsky District 
Rural localities in Kandalakshsky District:

 Alakurtti
 Beloye More
 Fedoseyevka
 Kayraly
 Knyazhaya Guba
 Kolvitsa
 Kovda, Lesozavodsky Territorial Okrug
 Kovda, Zelenoborsky
 Kovdozero
 Kuoloyarvi
 Lesozavodsky
 Luvenga
 Nivsky
 Nyamozero
 Pinozero
 Poyakonda
 Priozerny
 Prolivy
 Ruchyi
 Zarechensk
 Zhemchuzhnaya

Kirovsk 
Rural localities in Kirovsk:

 Koashva
 Titan

Kolsky District 
Rural localities in Kolsky District:

 Dalniye Zelentsy
 Golubye Ruchyi
 Kilpyavr
 Kitsa
 Loparskaya
 Magnetity
 Mezhdurechye
 Minkino
 Mishukovo
 Mokket
 Mokraya Kitsa
 Nyal
 Ostrov Bolshoy Oleny
 Peschany
 Pulozero
 Pushnoy
 Pyayve
 Shonguy
 Svetly
 Taybola
 Teriberka
 Tuloma (rural locality)
 Ura-Guba
 Vostochny Kildin
 Vykhodnoy
 Zapadny Kildin
 Zverosovkhoz

Kovdorsky District 
Rural localities in Kovdorsky District:

 Kuropta
 Leypi
 Rikolatva
 Slyuda
 Yona
 Yonsky

Lovozersky District 
Rural localities in Lovozersky District:

 Kanevka
 Krasnoshchelye
 Lovozero - administrative center
 Sosnovka

Monchegorsk 
Rural localities in Monchegorsk:

 25 km Zheleznoy Dorogi Monchegorsk–Olenya
 27 km Zheleznoy Dorogi Monchegorsk–Olenya
 Laplandsky Zapovednik

Olenegorsk 
Rural localities in Olenegorsk:

 Imandra
 Laplandiya
 Putevye Usadby 1331 km
 Vysoky, Murmansk Oblast
 Yagelny Bor

Ostrovnoy 
Rural localities in Ostrovnoy:

 Korabelnoye
 Lumbovka
 Mayak Gorodetsky
 Mys-Chyorny
 Svyatoy Nos
 Tersko-Orlovsky Mayak

Pechengsky District 
Rural localities in Pechengsky District:

 Borisoglebsky
 Korzunovo
 Liinakhamari
 Luostari - inhabited locality
 Luostari - railway station
 Pechenga
 Prirechny
 Putevaya Usadba 9 km zheleznoy dorogi Luostari–Nikel
 Rayakoski
 Salmiyarvi
 Sputnik
 Titovka
 Tsypnavolok
 Vayda-Guba

Polyarnye Zori 
Rural localities in Polyarnye Zori:

 Afrikanda
 Pirenga
 Zasheyek

Severomorsk 
Rural localities in Severomorsk:

 Severomorsk-3
 Shchukozero

Tersky District 
Rural localities in Tersky District:

 Chapoma
 Chavanga
 Indel
 Kashkarantsy
 Kuzomen
 Mayak Nikodimsky
 Olenitsa
 Pyalitsa
 Tetrino
 Varzuga
 Vostochnoye Munozero

Vidyayevo 
Rural localities in Vidyayevo:

 Chan-Ruchey
 Vidyayevo

Abolished localities 

 Drozdovka
 Goryachiye Ruchyi
 Mayak Tyuvagubsky
 Nautsi
 Nivankyul
 Oktyabrsky
 Zubovka

See also 
 
 Lists of rural localities in Russia

References 

Murmansk Oblast